Paweł Kapsa (born July 24, 1982 in Staszów) is a Polish footballer who plays for Austrian Regionalliga club SK Bischofshofen.

Career
In July 2013 Kapsa signed for Simurq of the Azerbaijan Premier League from Olympiakos Nicosia.

Career statistics

References

External links 
 

1982 births
Living people
People from Staszów County
Sportspeople from Świętokrzyskie Voivodeship
Polish footballers
Poland youth international footballers
Poland under-21 international footballers
Polish expatriate footballers
KSZO Ostrowiec Świętokrzyski players
Wisła Płock players
Widzew Łódź players
Lechia Gdańsk players
Alki Larnaca FC players
Olympiakos Nicosia players
Simurq PIK players
Khazar Lankaran FK players
Miedź Legnica players
Sandecja Nowy Sącz players
Bytovia Bytów players
Ekstraklasa players
I liga players
II liga players
Cypriot First Division players
Azerbaijan Premier League players
Expatriate footballers in Cyprus
Expatriate footballers in Azerbaijan
Expatriate footballers in Austria
Polish expatriate sportspeople in Cyprus
Polish expatriate sportspeople in Azerbaijan
Polish expatriate sportspeople in Austria
Association football goalkeepers